Raj Bhavan is the official residence of the governor of West Bengal, located in Kolkata, the capital of the Indian state of West Bengal. Built in 1803, it was known as Government House before Indian independence.

After the transfer of power from the East India Company to the British Crown in 1858, it became the official residence of the Viceroy of India, moving here from the Belvedere Estate. With the shifting of the British Indian capital from then Calcutta to Delhi in 1911, it became the official residence of Lieutenant Governor of Bengal. Since independence in 1947 it serves as the official residence of the Governor of West Bengal and came to be known as the Raj Bhavan, a name it shares with the official residences of other states' governors.

History

In the early nineteenth century Calcutta (Kolkata) was at the height of its golden age. Known as the City of Palaces or St. Petersburg of the East, Calcutta was the richest, largest and the most elegant colonial cities of India. It was during this time that one of Calcutta's finest colonial structures, Government House (later Raj Bhavan), was constructed.

Before 1799, the Governor-General resided in a rented house, called Buckingham House, located in the same location. The land belonged to Mohammad Reza Khan, a Nawab of Chitpur. It was in 1799 that the then Governor-General of India, The 1st Marquess Wellesley, took the initiative of building a palace, because he believed that India should be ruled from a palace and not from a country house.  Lord Wellesley wanted to make a statement to the imperial authority and power and so the building was done on a grand scale.

After four years' construction it was completed at a colossal cost of £63,291 (about £3.8 million in today's estimate). Wellesley was charged for misusing of East India Company’s fund and was finally recalled back to England in 1805. Although Wellesley lost his job, he does have the credit of giving Kolkata one of its finest colonial mansions.

In 1892, the Otis Elevator Company installed the first elevator in India at the Raj Bhavan.

Architecture

Designed by Capt. Charles Wyatt and on the lines of the Curzon’s family mansion of the Kedleston Hall of Derbyshire, the Raj Bhavan follows a Neoclassical style with distinct Baroque overtones. In a strange coincidence, a 100 years after its construction started, the most illustrious son of the Curzon family, George Nathaniel Curzon came to occupy the Raj Bhavan as the Viceroy of India. Lord Curzon described the Government House as “without doubt the finest Government House occupied by the representative of any Sovereign or Government in the world.”

Since the days of Lord Wellesley the Raj Bhavan had undergone several changes. In 1860s the Viceroy Lord Elgin added the metallic Dome. Lord Curzon brought electricity and lift (popularly known as the ‘Bird Cage Lift”) to Raj Bhavan. The tiny ornamentally designed  “Bird Cage Lift” operates to this day.

The plan comprises a central core with four radiating wings. The state rooms located in the central core are accessed from the outside by a flight of grand steps on the north. On the south is another portico surmounted by a colonnaded verandah with a dome above. The four wings accommodate the various offices and residential quarters along with four sets of staircases. The plan of the wings allows for a great deal of natural ventilation in the spaces while also permitting views across the gardens. The entire compound is surrounded by a balustraded wall with a grand arched gateways.

The Raj Bhavan has six gateways, one each on the north and south and two each on the east and west. The four gates on the east and west have grand archways topped with lions, while the minor archways on the side are topped with sphinxes.

The best view of the Raj Bhavan is obtained from the North Gate, which also serves as the main gate. A long walk past a decorated Chinese cannon leads to a flight of stairs to the portico crowned with the triangular pediment supported by six ionic pillars.

The Chinese cannon, mounted on a dragon and flanked with minor cannons, was brought from Nanking in 1842. An inscription on a marble plaque reads “The peace dictated to the Emperor of China under the walls of Nanking by the military force of England and of India.”

The South gate also provides a grand view, with the tree lined drive leading on to the lofty ionic pillars supporting the huge metallic dome. Entry inside the complex is strictly prohibited but photography is allowed from outside the gates with permission of the officer in charge at the gate.

Features
The plan comprises a central core with four radiating wings. The state rooms located in the central core are accessed from the outside by a flight of grand steps on the north. On the south is another portico surmounted by a colonnaded verandah with a dome above. The four wings accommodate the various offices and residential quarters along with four sets of staircases. The plan of the wings allows for a great deal of natural ventilation in the spaces while also permitting views across the gardens. The entire compound is surrounded by a balustraded wall with a grand arched gateway at each of the four cardinal points.

The plan of the building is very typical, a little like a man standing on his feet and holding two boxes in his two hands. The front of the palace faces north-east.

Interior
The three-storeyed Raj Bhavan building has a huge central area consisting of large halls having curved corridors on all four sides radiating to detached wings, each constituting a house in itself. There are about 60 rooms in Raj Bhavan, besides public halls, verandahs, porticos, banquets & halls and the cavernous  Throne room.

Residential suites
The residential portion is divided into four suites.  The Prince of Wales Suite in the north-west wing of the first floor is where the President, Vice-President and the Prime Minister of India and  heads of state of other nations reside when visiting the state of West Bengal. The Wellesley Suite is located on the second floor in the north-eastern wing, the Dufferin Suite is on the second floor of north-west wing, and the fourth suite is the Anderson Suite.
The ex-governor, Keshrinath Tripati has, however, changed the names of these suites to Indian names, e.g.: Prince of Wales suite to Rabindranath Tagore kaksh, Wellesley suite to Sagar kaksh, Dufferin Suite to Kanchenjunga kaksh and Anderson Suite to Vivekananda kaksh.

Drawing and dining rooms
Yellow Drawing Room: Located on the first floor of the Raj Bhavan, the beautiful drawing room has some wonderful paintings.

Blue Drawing Room: An elegantly furnished room used by the governor to meet guest.

Brown Dining Room: Adjacent to the Blue Dining room, it is used for small conferences and meetings.

Halls and banquet rooms
Throne Room: The Throne Room, as the name suggests, contains the throne of Wellesley. Next to it is the throne of Tipu Sultan. The room contains oil paintings of Mahatma Gandhi, Subhas Chandra Bose, Jawaharlal Nehru, Dr B C Roy. It also contains an Urn used to carry the Mahatma Gandhi's ashes.

Council Chamber: The Governor General used the Council Chamber to preside over the executive and later the Legislative Council. Now it is used by the governor to hold large meetings. A small dining room known as the Bharat Ratna Room and a billiard room is located just outside the Council Chamber.

The Marble Hall: Located on the ground floor of the Raj Bhavan, this is used for state and private meetings.

The Banquet Hall: The Banquet Hall with rows of Doric pillars on each side, flowering chandeliers and black Mahogany tables has entertained eminent guests like Queen Elizabeth.

Picture gallery

Old photos

Present photos

See also
 Government Houses of the British Indian Empire

References

External links

 The official website of Governor of West Bengal
 
 
 
 
Government House, Calcutta Undated 19th Century painting

Governors' houses in West Bengal
Houses completed in 1803
Palaces in Kolkata
Tourist attractions in Kolkata
Governors' houses in India
Government buildings in West Bengal
Neoclassical architecture in India